Ginkgo ginkgoidea is an extinct ginkgo species in the family Ginkgoaceae from the Bajocian of southern Sweden.

References

ginkgoidea
Mesozoic trees